Centerville Historic District is a historic district in Centerville, Pennsylvania.  Centerville represents an intact example of the "pike town" typical of the National Road in Pennsylvania. Little commercial activity remains in the town today, but the ninety-four contributing buildings in the district includes taverns, residences, shops, and services buildings typical of the rise and decline of the National Road.

Centerville is designated as a historic district by the Washington County History & Landmarks Foundation, and is listed on the National Register of Historic Places.

References

Houses on the National Register of Historic Places in Pennsylvania
Georgian architecture in Pennsylvania
Houses completed in 1821
Historic districts in Washington County, Pennsylvania
Houses in Washington County, Pennsylvania
Historic districts on the National Register of Historic Places in Pennsylvania
National Register of Historic Places in Washington County, Pennsylvania